Kochillathu Zacharias Mar Polycarpos (23 July 1970 – 21 June 2022) was the Metropolitan of Malankara  Syriac Orthodox Church.
He served on the advisory boards of various educational institutions including St Mary's College Meenangadi, St Peter's & St Paul's English Medium School and Aramaia International Residential School.

Zacharias left the world from heart attack in a hospital at Manarcaud on 21 June 2022 at the age of 51.

References 

1970 births
2022 deaths
Syriac Orthodox Church bishops
Indian Oriental Orthodox Christians